Ciprian is a given or family name. Notable people with the name include:
Cyprian, bishop of Carthage
Ciprian Brata (born 1991), Romanian footballer
Ciprian Danciu (born 1977), Romanian football player and the manager of FC Baia Mare
Ciprian Deac (born 1986), Romanian professional footballer
Ciprian Dianu (born 1977), Romanian football player
Ciprian Dinu (born 1982), Romanian footballer
Ciprian Foias (1933–2020), Romanian-American mathematician
Ciprian Manolescu (born 1978), Romanian mathematician
Ciprian Marica (born 1985), Romanian footballer
Ciprian Milea (born 1984), Romanian football player
Ciprian Petre (born 1980), Romanian football player
Ciprian Popa (born 1980), Romanian sprint canoeist who has competed since 2005
Ciprian Porumbescu (1853–1883), Romanian composer
Ciprian Prodan (born 1979), Romanian footballer
Ciprian Suciu (born 1987), Romanian football player
Ciprian Tănasă (born 1981), Romanian football player
Ciprian Tătărușanu (born 1986), Romanian footballer
Ciprian Vasilache (born 1983), Romanian football midfielder
George Ciprian (1883–1968), Romanian actor and playwright

See also
1932 San Ciprian hurricane, powerful Atlantic tropical cyclone that struck Puerto Rico in the 1932 Atlantic hurricane season
Ciprian Porumbescu, Suceava, commune located in Suceava County, Romania
George Ciprian Theatre, theatre in Buzău, Romania, that opened in 1995 under the patronage of Paul Ioachim
 Cyprianus, Latin form of the same name

Romanian masculine given names